U tvojim očima is the sixth studio album by the Sarajevo band Crvena jabuka. The album was originally released on January 17, 1996.

Content
This album was the first to have Crvena jabuka in their new lineup. There were many songwriters on the album including Saša Lošić.

The album's hit single was "Sanjam te" which was performed by Dražen Ričl, and Aljoša Buha before their deaths in 1986. Then it was re edited by the rest of the band.

There were some guest appearances on this album. First was Alen Vitasović on the song "Vraćam se tebi seko" as well as Saša Lošić on "Bijeli Bozić".

Although the album is called U tvojim očima, there is no such song on the album according to the track listing. Though the phrase is mentioned on some songs such as "Sanjam te", and "Kao da sanjam". Also what is unique about this album is that next to 1991's Nekako s' Proljeca it is missing the band's logo-a red apple.

Track listing

 Ne Govori Više
 Kad ćes mi doć?
 Sanjam Te
 Vraćam se tebi Seko
 Stari Moj
 Sad je Srce Stijena
 Iza Prozora
 Deni
 Sjećanja
 Kao da sanjam
 Radio
 Mahala
 Bijeli Božić

Personnel

Darko Jelcic - drums, percussion
Danijel Lastric -  keyboards
Kresmir Krestalen -  bass
Drazen Zeric  - vocals
Niksa Bratos -  violin, mandolin, keyboards, synthesizer, guitar
Mario Vukušić Jimmy -  guitar
Darija Hodnik -  backing vocals
Jana Nemacek  - backing vocals
Alen Vitasović  - guest vocals on track 4
Saša Lošić  - guest vocals on track 13

1996 albums
Crvena jabuka albums